Henry Charles FitzRoy Somerset, 8th Duke of Beaufort KG, PC, DL (1 February 1824 – 30 April 1899), styled Earl of Glamorgan until 1835 and Marquess of Worcester from 1835 to 1853, was a British peer, soldier, and Conservative Party politician. He served as Master of the Horse between 1858 and 1859 and again between 1866 and 1868.

Background and education
Born in Paris, he was the only son of Henry Somerset, 7th Duke of Beaufort by his second wife Emily Frances, daughter of Charles Culling Smith and his wife Lady Anne Wellesley. He was educated at Eton College.

Military career
Beaufort was commissioned a Cornet and Sublieutenant in the 1st Life Guards on 17 August 1841. From 1842 to 1852, he was an aide-de-camp to the Duke of Wellington, then Commander-in-Chief of the Forces (Beaufort's father had also been Wellington's aide-de-camp during the Peninsular War). He was promoted lieutenant on 7 July 1843. On 13 August 1847, he purchased a captaincy in the 7th Hussars.

On 15 June 1852, Beaufort was appointed a deputy lieutenant of Gloucestershire, and after the death of Wellington in September, he continued to serve as aide-de-camp to the new Commander-in-Chief, Viscount Hardinge, until the latter's death in 1856.

On 21 April 1854, Beaufort purchased a commission as an unattached major, and on 5 May, he was appointed Lieutenant-Colonel Commandant of the Royal Gloucestershire Yeomanry, replacing his late father. During this time it was proposed to start "a cattle show" in Monmouth, and in 1857 Beaufort and John Etherington Welch Rolls each put money into a fund to start the show. Rolls was the greater financial contributor and he became President of the show. This cattle show is now known as the Monmouthshire Show.

Beaufort was breveted lieutenant colonel on 26 October 1858, but sold his commission and left the Army on 11 June 1861. On 16 September 1863, he was made a deputy lieutenant of Monmouthshire. He was also appointed Honorary Colonel of the 1st Gloucestershire Engineer Volunteer Corps on 20 November 1867. On 29 April 1874, he resigned the lieutenant-colonelcy of the Gloucestershire Yeomanry and became Honorary Colonel of the regiment. He resigned that commission on 2 July 1887. He also resigned the honorary colonelcy of the 1st Gloucestershire Engineer Volunteers on 2 December 1888.

Political career
In 1846, Beaufort was returned as a Member of Parliament (MP) for East Gloucestershire, holding the seat until succeeding his father in the dukedom in November 1853. He was appointed Master of the Horse on 26 February 1858, as part of Lord Derby's second government and was made a Privy Counsellor the same day. He left office in 1859, when Derby's ministry fell. Beaufort was again appointed Master of the Horse in Derby's third government in 1866. On 19 March 1867, he was made a Knight of the Garter and appointed Lord Lieutenant of Monmouthshire later that year. He lost the Mastership of the Horse in 1868 when the government fell, but remained Lord Lieutenant for the remainder of his life.

Beaufort conceived and planned the Badminton Library series of sporting books, the publication of which began in 1885 with a volume on Hunting, and acted as its overseeing editor.

Family
Beaufort married Lady Georgiana Charlotte Curzon (29 September 1825 – 14 May 1906), daughter of Richard Curzon-Howe, 1st Earl Howe, on 3 July 1845. They had six children:

Henry Adelbert Wellington FitzRoy Somerset, 9th Duke of Beaufort (1847–1924); married Louise Emily Harford and had issue.
Lord Henry Richard Charles Somerset (1849–1932); married Lady Isabella Caroline Cocks and had issue.
Major Lord Henry Arthur George Somerset (1851–1926); died unmarried.
Major Lord Henry Edward Brudenell Somerset (1853–1897); married Fanny Julia Dixie, daughter of Sir Alexander Dixie, 10th Baronet, and had issue.
Lady Blanche Elizabeth Adelaide Somerset (c. 1854–1897); married John Beresford, 5th Marquess of Waterford and had issue.

Somerset died in 1899, aged 75 at Stoke Gifford, Gloucestershire, from gout and was buried on 5 May 1899 at St Michael and All Angels Church, Badminton.

Ancestry

References

External links 

 

1824 births
1899 deaths
7th Queen's Own Hussars officers
British Life Guards officers
Worcester, Henry Somerset, Marquess of
Deputy Lieutenants of Gloucestershire
Deputy Lieutenants of Monmouthshire
108
16
08
Henry Somerset, 08th Duke of Beaufort
Knights of the Garter
Lord-Lieutenants of Monmouthshire
English people of Irish descent
Masters of foxhounds in England
Members of the Privy Council of the United Kingdom
People educated at Eton College
Worcester, Henry Somerset, Marquess of
Worcester, Henry Somerset, Marquess of
Worcester, Henry Somerset, Marquess of
UK MPs who inherited peerages
Royal Gloucestershire Hussars officers
Presidents of the Marylebone Cricket Club
19th-century British landowners
19th-century British businesspeople